Just one athlete from the Kingdom of Yugoslavia competed at the 1932 Summer Olympics in Los Angeles, United States.

Athletics

Men

References
Official Olympic Reports

Nations at the 1932 Summer Olympics
1932
Summer Olympics